Miroslav Savanović (born 10 March 1985 in Belgrade) is a Serbian professional footballer who plays attacking midfielder for Sheikh Russell in the Bangladesh Premier League.

External links
Profile and stats in Srbijafudbal.

1985 births
Living people
Footballers from Belgrade
Serbian footballers
FK Borac Čačak players
SC Cham players
Expatriate footballers in Switzerland
Association football midfielders
FK Jagodina players
FK Kolubara players
FK Mladi Radnik players
Serbian SuperLiga players
FK Sileks players